Bassin du Diable (Devil's Lake) is a lake in the city of Saint-Denis, Réunion, France. This lake is at an elevation of 500 m, from the river bed Grand Bras, a tributary of the Rivière Saint-Denis.

Lakes of Réunion
Réunion National Park